Dance/Electronic Digital Song Sales, previously Dance/Electronic Digital Songs is a weekly chart that ranks the best-selling digital dance and electronic singles in the United States, according to Billboard. Although it originally started tracking singles the week of January 2, 2010, it did not become an official chart until the issue dated April 3, 2010.

The Dance/Electronic Digital Songs chart tracks the 50 most popular downloaded dance music singles, including tracks that are exclusively available online only. This chart also includes previously released dance and disco songs that became available for downloading, which means that songs like "You Spin Me Round (Like a Record)" by Dead or Alive are eligible to chart.

On January 17, 2013, Billboard added the Hot Dance/Electronic Songs chart, which tracks the 50 most popular dance and electronic songs based on club play, singles sales, radio airplay across all formats, digital downloads, and online streaming.

The chart's first number one was "Bad Romance" by Lady Gaga in the January 23, 2010 issue. Since 2019, the chart's longest running number-one is "Happier" by Marshmello and Bastille, reigning at the lead position for 30 non-consecutive weeks.

References

External links
Billboard Online

Billboard charts